Sophus Peter Hansen (16 November 1889 – 19 February 1962) was a Danish amateur football (soccer) player and referee. He won a silver medal with the Denmark national team at the 1912 Summer Olympics. He also participated with the Danish team at the 1920 Summer Olympics.

Born in Copenhagen, he played his entire career as a goalkeeper for local club Boldklubben Frem. He made his national team debut in 1911, and was the first player to reach 25 caps for the Danish national team. He played a record-setting 31 Danish national team games, before ending his national team career in 1920. The record was broken by Poul "Tist" Nielsen in October 1923.

He is well known for stopping 2 crosses in the 1912 Olympic final against Great Britain.

In his civil life Hansen was employed, at first as a stonemason, and later as an insurance man. In the years 1922-1934 excelled as a football referee refereeing about 20 internationals. In the 1930 Mitropa Cup Hansen refereed both the semifinals and both legs of the final between Sparta Prague and Rapid Vienna. Hansen was also a respected football jurist.

He died in February 1962, while living at Østerbro in Copenhagen.

Bibliography
Autobiography
Sophus Målmand, 1949

References

External links
Danish national team profile

1889 births
1962 deaths
Danish men's footballers
Denmark international footballers
Association football goalkeepers
Boldklubben Frem players
Footballers at the 1912 Summer Olympics
Footballers at the 1920 Summer Olympics
Olympic footballers of Denmark
Olympic silver medalists for Denmark
Danish football referees
Olympic medalists in football
Medalists at the 1912 Summer Olympics
Fremad Amager managers
Danish football managers
Footballers from Copenhagen